The 2004 All-Ireland Minor Football Championship was the 73rd staging of the All-Ireland Minor Football Championship, the Gaelic Athletic Association's premier inter-county Gaelic football tournament for boys under the age of 18. Laois entered the championship as defending champions, however, they were defeated by Kerry in the All-Ireland semi-final.

On 26 September 2004, Tyrone won the championship following a 0-12 to 0-10 defeat of Kerry in the All-Ireland final. This was their sixth All-Ireland title overall and their first title in three championship seasons.

Results

Connacht Minor Football Championship

Quarter-Final

Semi-Finals

Final

Leinster Minor Football Championship

Rob Robin

Semi-Finals

Final

Munster Minor Football Championship

Rob Robin

Semi-Finals

Final

Ulster Minor Football Championship

Rob Robin

Semi-Final

Final

All-Ireland Minor Football Championship

Quarter-finals

Semi-finals

Final

References

2004
All-Ireland Minor Football Championship